A I A: Dream Loss is the sixth studio album by American musician Liz Harris under the stage name Grouper. It is the first of her two-part album series A I A, released on April 11, 2011 on Yellow Electric.

Critical reception

A I A: Dream Loss, along with A I A: Alien Observer, received an honorable mention on Pitchforks list of the best albums of 2011.

Track listing

References

2011 albums
Grouper (musician) albums